Derry Township may refer to:
 Derry Township, Pike County, Illinois
 Derry Township, Dauphin County, Pennsylvania
 Derry Township, Mifflin County, Pennsylvania
 Derry Township, Montour County, Pennsylvania
 Derry Township, Westmoreland County, Pennsylvania

Township name disambiguation pages